Sangrama is a 1987 Indian Kannada language action crime film directed by K. V. Raju. The movie was a remake of Sunny Deol starrer 1985 hit movie Arjun.

Cast
V. Ravichandran
Bhavya
Lokesh
Ramakrishna
Lokanath
Jaggesh
Mukhyamantri Chandru
Ramesh Aravind
Disco Shanti in an item number

Soundtrack
Soundtrack was composed by Hamsalekha.
Dandam Dashagunam – S. P. Balasubrahmanyam
Vandane Nooru – S. P. Balasubrahmanyam
Avasarapurada – S. P. Balasubrahmanyam
Adenadu – S. Janaki

References

1987 films
Indian action films
Kannada remakes of Hindi films
Films scored by Hamsalekha
1980s Kannada-language films
1987 action films